The Balconies were a Canadian alternative music trio formed in Ottawa, Ontario. The band originally consisted of siblings Jacquie and Steve Neville, and Liam Jaeger. The group has performed with bands such as Cold War Kids, Mother Mother, Devo, Peter Bjorn and John, USS, Sloan, Stars, Wide Mouth Mason, Big Sugar, Tokyo Police Club, Bad Religion, and Sam Roberts Band.

History
Jacquie and Stephen Neville had been playing music together since their early teens. Jacquie first met Liam Jaeger at the University of Ottawa in 2005 while they were both studying classical music. The group formed in late 2007. They released their self-titled debut album in 2009. It was recorded and produced by Carlin Nicholson of Zeus. They played in Ottawa bars, and later their music changed, as they did, maybe they just grew up.

In late 2010, the band relocated to Toronto. That same year, the Balconies won Live 88.5's Big Money Shot which gave them a development package of $75,000, workshops with other music industry leaders, radio airplay, and numerous performance opportunities. Upon winning the development package, The Balconies were able to work with recording producer/engineer Jon Drew to record and release an EP titled Kill Count in 2012. During this time, the band also played at several North American music festivals such as South by Southwest, Canadian Music Week, North by Northeast, Ottawa Bluesfest, and Culture Collide.

In 2013, The Balconies played a series of notable European music festivals including MIDEM, Liverpool Sound City, and The Great Escape Festival. The Balconies also continued to tour Europe that year, opening for rock band, Rival Sons. The band's second album, Fast Motions, produced by Arnold Lanni, was released via Coalition Music/Warner Music Canada on January 28, 2014.

The Balconies appeared in an episode of CBC's Cracked. The episode features the band getting caught in a shooting at a downtown nightclub. The episode aired October 7, 2013.

Shortly after Stephen Neville left the group in 2016, The Balconies released their third album, Rhonda.

In late 2017, The Balconies announced that they were dissolving their act on their 10th anniversary. Along with a series of final concerts in Toronto and Ottawa, they also put out a previously unreleased studio album, Show You (recorded in 2012), and did a re-release of their 2009 debut album. They played their final show at The 27 Club in Ottawa on February 3, 2018.

In 2018, Jacquie Neville announced that while the band would no longer tour, the members would be moving more towards music production working under the name The Balconies Collective.

Members 
Jacquie Neville – guitar, vocals (2007—2018)
Liam Jaeger – drums, guitar, vocals (2007—2018)
Stephen Neville — bass (2007—2016)

Discography

Albums
The Balconies (2009)
Fast Motions (2014)
Rhonda (2016)
Show You (2017)

Singles and EPs
Kill Count (2012)
"Kill Count (French Version)" (2012)
"Do It in the Dark" (2012)
"Money Money" (2016)
"War" (2016)
"Rhonda" (2016)

Music videos
"Do It in the Dark" (2012)
"The Slo" (2013)
"Good and Ugly" (2014)
"Boys and Girls (2014)

References

External links
 Facebook
 Twitter
 YouTube
 Instagram
 Bandcamp

Canadian alternative rock groups
Musical groups from Ottawa
Musical groups established in 2007
Musical groups disestablished in 2018
2007 establishments in Ontario
2018 disestablishments in Ontario